Vera Isaku born in March 1955 is an  Albanian journalist, writer and director of institutions.

Life 
Isaku graduated at 1979 in University of Tirana, Faculty of Albanian Linguistics and Literature, and is one of the first journalists ladies of the Newspaper Rilindja Demokratike –  Democratic Rebirth and the author of many written articles in daily press in and outside Albania. Vera Isaku held the position of Vice Director of Albanian Radio and Television and the other position as a Director of International Center of Culture at the Pyramid of Tirana. Isaku was the wife of the writer, diplomat and publicist Agim Isaku, ambassador of the Republic of Albania in Bratislava, Slovakia. She died, at the age of 66. Isaku lost her life as a result of an incurable disease, from which she suffered for a long time.

Books 
 2000 – "Bald Fates" – "Fate Tullace" , 
 2002 – "Fate hang in Biarritz" – "Në Biarritz rri fati" , 
 2004 – "Good intentions" – "Qëllime të mira" 
 2007. - Shqipëtarët nuk e njohin grinë : publicistike Tiranë : Botimet "Isaku", 
 2008 – "Russian Ladies in Albania" – "Ruset ne Shqipëri"

See also 
List of Albanians (section writers)
List of Albanians (section journalists)
List of Albanian writers

References 

Bksh.al

External links 
Gazeta Shqip
  shtepiaelibrit.com
  botimeshqip.com

1955 births
Albanian journalists
Living people
University of Tirana alumni
Albanian women journalists